Lloyd Jason Blackman (born 24 September 1983) is an English retired semi-professional footballer who is assistant manager of Tonbridge Angels. As a player, he played as a forward in the Football League for Brentford and after his release in 2004, he embarked on a nomadic career in non-League football. He began coaching while still a player and managed Ramsgate and Whitstable Town.

Career

Brentford 
A forward, Blackman began his career in the youth system at Crystal Palace and later moved to Brentford, where he began a scholarship in 2000. He progressed to sign his first professional contract in 2002. He made his first team debut with a start in a 5–1 Second Division defeat to Peterborough United on 28 September 2002, which proved to be his only appearance of the 2002–03 season. After signing a new one-year contract in May 2003, Blackman made just four appearances during 2003–04 and spent much of the season away on loan at non-League clubs Scarborough, Chelmsford City and Cambridge City. He was released in late April 2004, after having made just five appearances during two seasons as a professional at Griffin Park.

Non-League football 
In 2004, Blackman embarked on a career in non-League football. Between 2004 and 2015, he played in the Conference, Isthmian League, Southern League and Southern Counties East League for 15 clubs.

International career 
In October 2004, Blackman was named in manager Paul Fairclough's initial 30-man England National Game XI squad for a match versus Serie C on 10 November 2004. He was not named in the final 16-man squad.

Managerial and coaching career 

Between 2012 and 2015, Blackman held the role of first team coach at Hythe Town and Ashford United respectively. He moved to Isthmian League First Division South club Ramsgate as first team coach in December 2015 and was promoted to manager in January 2017. He stayed in the role until resigning in December 2018. On 17 April 2019, it was announced that Blackman would take up the role of manager at Isthmian League South East Division club Whitstable Town from the beginning of the 2019–20 season. He presided over two abandoned seasons and departed in September 2021. One month later, he joined Isthmian League Premier Division club Margate as assistant manager. In May 2022, Blackman followed former Margate manager Jay Saunders to National League South club Tonbridge Angels.

Career statistics

References

External links 

1983 births
Living people
English footballers
Crystal Palace F.C. players
Brentford F.C. players
Scarborough F.C. players
Chelmsford City F.C. players
Cambridge City F.C. players
Farnborough F.C. players
Woking F.C. players
Crawley Town F.C. players
Llanelli Town A.F.C. players
Maidstone United F.C. players
Margate F.C. players
Whitstable Town F.C. players
Hythe Town F.C. players
Chatham Town F.C. players
English Football League players
National League (English football) players
Bishop's Stortford F.C. players
Bromley F.C. players
Welling United F.C. players
Folkestone Invicta F.C. players
Carshalton Athletic F.C. players
Ashford United F.C. players
Ramsgate F.C. managers
Isthmian League managers
English football managers
Isthmian League players
Southern Football League players
Association football forwards
Association football coaches